Planea is a genus of flowering plants in the pussy's-toes tribe within the sunflower family. The only known species is Planea schlechteri, a rare and threatened species known from only a single population in Western Cape Province in South Africa.

References

External links
iSpot Nature, Sanbi, Observations in the Species: Planea schlechteri photo

Gnaphalieae
Monotypic Asteraceae genera
Endemic flora of South Africa
Endangered plants
Taxa named by Louisa Bolus